Paragylla amoureli is a moth of the subfamily Arctiinae. It was described by Paul Dognin in 1890. It is found in Ecuador.

References

Lithosiini
Moths described in 1890